Shakespeare & Company is an American theatre company located in Lenox, Massachusetts in the Berkshire region of western Massachusetts.  It was founded in 1978 by artistic director Tina Packer, who stepped down in 2009. Allyn Burrows is the current artistic director.  A co-founder was Kristin Linklater, who developed the Linklater vocal technique and left the company in the mid-1990s. The company performs Shakespeare and new plays of "social and political significance", reaching over 75,000 patrons annually, and it conducts training programs for professional classical actors as well as education programs for elementary through high school students, the latter reaching over 50,000 students annually.

From 1978 to 2001, Shakespeare & Company was based at The Mount, Edith Wharton's historic property in Lenox, Massachusetts.

Shakespeare & Company is listed as a major festival in the book Shakespeare Festivals Around the World by Marcus D. Gregio (Editor), 2004.

The Fall Festival of Shakespeare
Each fall, the education department of Shakespeare & Company hosts a program called "The Fall Festival of Shakespeare.”. 10 high schools in Berkshire County, New York, central and eastern Massachusetts participate in this program. Teaching Artists and Technicians from the company come into the schools and work with the students to create 90 minute cuts of plays by Shakespeare. Each school has performances at their own venue, then all the plays are performed the weekend before Thanksgiving at Shakespeare & Co. The Fall Festival of Shakespeare is a non-competitive celebration of the students work. The festival celebrated its 30th year in 2018.

Notable actors and alumni
Karen Allen
Lauren Ambrose
Gillian Barge
Alicia Coppola
Rebecca De Mornay
Richard Dreyfuss
Olympia Dukakis
Peter Firth
Christine Lahti
Hamish Linklater
Andie MacDowell
Fred Melamed
Joe Morton
Bill Murray
Jeffrey Pierce
Bronson Pinchot
Oliver Platt
Diana Quick
Keanu Reeves
Jennifer Rubin
Alicia Silverstone
Anna Deavere Smith
John Douglas Thompson
Courtney Vance
Sigourney Weaver
Finn Wittrock

References

External links
 Official website
 New York Times review
 Harvard School of Education, Project Zero Study

1978 establishments in Massachusetts
Festivals in Massachusetts
Shakespeare festivals in the United States
Shakespearean theatre companies
Theatre companies in Massachusetts